PAF Captain Guillermo Concha Iberico International Airport  is an airport serving Piura, Peru. It is the main airport of the department of Piura, the second most populous of Peru's regions.

The airport is run by Aeropuertos del Perú (AdP), a private operator that manages various airports in northern Peru. It is served by JetSmart, LATAM Perú and Sky Airline.

Airlines and destinations

Incidents and accidents
On March 28, 1998 a Peruvian Air Force Antonov 32 carrying the dual civil/military registration OB-1389/FAP-388 and inbound from Tumbes evacuating  50 people stranded by El Niño-driven floods had an engine failure while approaching Piura. As the aircraft was overloaded, the pilot could not maintain altitude, and the plane struck three houses of a nearby shantytown and crashed into a canal. While the crew of five survived, 21 passengers and one person on the ground died.
On 20 September 2005, an Air Rum L1011 full of Gambian football fans heading for Lima, Peru faked a fuel starvation emergency so that the flight had to divert to Piura. The fans were going to support their national team playing in the city for the 2005 FIFA U-17 World Championship.

See also
Transport in Peru
List of airports in Peru

References

External links    
OurAirports - Piura
SkyVector - Piura

Airports in Peru
Buildings and structures in Piura Region